The Salford area of Greater Manchester has been represented in the House of Commons of the Parliament of the United Kingdom through several parliamentary constituencies:

Salford